Kahrizeh may refer to various places in Iran:
 Kahrizeh, Divandarreh, Kurdistan Province
 Kahrizeh, Marivan, Kurdistan Province
 Kahrizeh, Saqqez, Kurdistan Province
 Kahrizeh-ye Ayyubi, Saqqez County, Kurdistan Province
 Kahrizeh-ye Ajam, West Azerbaijan Province
 Kahrizeh-ye Ali Aqa, West Azerbaijan Province
 Kahrizeh-ye Mahmud Aqa, West Azerbaijan Province
 Kahrizeh-ye Shakak, West Azerbaijan Province